The Davis Cup is an annual international team event in men's tennis. Established in 1900 as the International Lawn Tennis Challenge, it is run by the International Tennis Federation (ITF), who describe it as the "World Cup of tennis." The first event in 1900 was a match between Great Britain and the United States, while 135 nations  entered the 2016 Davis Cup.

The tournament sees players competing for their country in four singles and one doubles matches, known as rubbers, over the course of three days, with the team that wins three rubbers progressing. The countries are divided into groups based upon their location or performance in previous years. The Davis Cup World Group is the top level of the competition and features matches between players from the top 16 countries at the start of the year. Countries that lose their first round match face a relegation play-off against winning countries from the continental zones. World Group winning countries progress to the quarter-finals. Nations have to win a further three ties in order to claim the position of Davis Cup champions.The United States are the most successful nation in the history of the competition, with 32 victories. Australia are second with 28 (individually or in a combined Australasia team) and Great Britain and France are tied for third with 10. Teams from Europe have won the competition the most with 46 victories, followed by North America with 33 and Oceania with 28.

History
The Davis Cup was founded in 1900 as the International Lawn Tennis Challenge. Four members of Harvard University wished to challenge Great Britain in a tennis competition. One of the American players, Dwight F. Davis, designed a tournament format and ordered a sterling silver trophy from Shreve, Crump & Low for approximately $1,000. The first match, held at Longwood Cricket Club in Boston, Massachusetts, was won by the American team 3–0. There was no match the following year, but the United States retained the trophy in 1902, beating Great Britain 3–2. This was followed by four successive victories for Britain, from 1903 to 1906. The 1904 Davis Cup saw new teams compete for the first time, as Belgium and France entered.

Australasia (Australia and New Zealand) became the first victors outside of Britain and the United States when they won the tournament in 1907. No tournament was held in 1910 as no country challenged Australasia, who retained the trophy until 1912 when they were defeated by Great Britain. The United States and Australasia won the two competitions prior to the outbreak of the First World War, in 1914. The tournament resumed in 1919, with Australasia retaining the trophy, beating Great Britain 4–1.  The Americans won the following seven tournaments before they were defeated 3–2 by France in 1927. The tournament underwent restructuring for the 1923 edition. Teams were split into two zones; the 'America Zone' and 'Europe Zone', with the winners playing each other to determine who would face the defending champions.

The French won a further five successive tournaments before they were beaten 3–2 by Great Britain in 1933. Australia were the last winners before the onset of the Second World War. They beat the United States 3–2 in 1939. Upon resumption of the tournament in 1946, it was renamed the Davis Cup after the death of Dwight D. Davis in 1945. The United States regained the title after they beat Australia 5–0. They retained the title until 1950 when Australia won 4–1. This marked the start of Australian dominance of the Davis Cup, as they only lost three times from 1950 to 1967. Prior to 1972, the champion received a bye directly to the final.

The 1974 Davis Cup marked the first time that neither Australia or the United States won the final since 1936, as South Africa and India were the finalists. However, the Indian team refused to travel to South Africa in protest at the South African government's apartheid policies, meaning that the final was scratched and South Africa were awarded the Davis Cup. Sweden beat Czechoslovakia 3–2 the following year to become the first European nation since 1936 to win the Davis Cup. 

The Davis Cup underwent further reorganisation in 1981 when a 16-team World Group was introduced. The remaining nations were split into regional groups with promotion and relegation to and from the World Group.

Sweden reached two more finals in 1988 and 1989, but lost both times to West Germany. The United States regained the title in 1990, but they lost 3–1 to France the following year. They regained the title a year later, but could not defend it in 1993 as Germany won. Sweden were victorious in 1994, and they won a further two Davis Cups in 1997 and 1998. Australia regained the Davis Cup in 1999, but they lost the following two finals to Spain and France respectively. Russia won their first Davis Cup in 2002, before Australia regained the title the following year. Spain won the tournament for the second time in 2004, and would win a further three titles in 2008, 2009 and 2011. The Czech Republic won successive Davis Cups in 2012 and 2013, before Switzerland won their first title in 2014. In 2015, Great Britain ended the longest drought in the competition's history, 73 years, when they won their first Davis Cup since 1936, beating Belgium 3–1.

Finals

 The "Year" column refers to the year the Davis Cup tournament was held, and wikilinks to the article about that tournament.
 Links in the "Winners" and "Runners-up" columns point to the articles for the national teams of the countries, not the articles for the countries.

Victories by team

All-time

Since 1972

Victories by continent

See also
 List of Billie Jean King Cup champions
 Hopman Cup finals by year

Notes

References 

Champions
Davis Cup